Milenko Kersnić (born 21 June 1946) is a Slovenian gymnast. He competed at the 1968 Summer Olympics and the 1972 Summer Olympics.

References

External links
 

1946 births
Living people
Slovenian male artistic gymnasts
Olympic gymnasts of Yugoslavia
Gymnasts at the 1968 Summer Olympics
Gymnasts at the 1972 Summer Olympics
Competitors at the 1971 Mediterranean Games
Mediterranean Games gold medalists for Yugoslavia
Mediterranean Games medalists in gymnastics
Sportspeople from Ljubljana